James Reed (born February 3, 1977) is a former American football defensive tackle that played in the National Football League (NFL). He was drafted by the New York Jets in the seventh round of the 2001 NFL Draft. He played college football at Iowa State.

Reed has also played for the Kansas City Chiefs and New Orleans Saints.

High School Career
James Reed went to Saginaw High School in Saginaw, Michigan.  He played offensive tackle his junior year, and started at Middle Linebacker  his senior year.  James Reed played on some outstanding high school football teams at Saginaw High School. His junior year was the first winning record for the trojans in 5 years. James also helped the Trojans win the school’s first Saginaw Valley League title in 1996, since 1951. Reed, a 6-foot, 240-pound linebacker for the Trojans, received All-Area and All-State honors his senior year in 1996 after recording 117 tackles, 10 sacks and two interceptions.

Reed was inducted into the Saginaw County Sports Hall Of Fame in 2014.

College career
Reed attended Iowa State University, and was a three-year starter and a three-time All-Big 12 conference selection. He helped get the Cyclones their first bowl win ever.

Professional career

Kansas City Chiefs
On April 17, 2007, Reed was re-signed to the Chiefs with a three-year contract.
He only played out one year of the contract after the Chiefs released him on February 27, 2008.

New Orleans Saints
On August 4, 2008, Reed was signed by the New Orleans Saints. Reed was placed on the injured reserve after he tore his Achilles tendon in training camp.

References

External links
 New Orleans Saints bio
 New York Jets bio
 James Reed Saginaw County Hall of Fame link

1977 births
Living people
American football defensive tackles
Iowa State Cyclones football players
Kansas City Chiefs players
New Orleans Saints players
New York Jets players
Sportspeople from Saginaw, Michigan
Players of American football from Michigan